This is a list of universities, colleges and branch campuses of foreign universities in Qatar.

Qatari institutions
 University of Doha for Science & Technology
 Community College of Qatar
 Doha Institute for Graduate Studies
 Lusail University
 Qatar Aeronautical College
 Qatar University
 Hamad bin Khalifa University
 University Foundation College

Foreign university campuses
 OUC with Liverpool John Moores University https://oryx.edu.qa/
 University of Aberdeen
 University of Calgary
Northumbria University
 Academic Bridge Programme
 Carnegie Mellon University in Qatar
 Georgetown University School of Foreign Service in Qatar
 HEC Paris in Qatar
 Northwestern University in Qatar
 Stenden University Qatar
 Syscoms Institute
 Texas A&M University at Qatar
 Virginia Commonwealth University in Qatar
 Weill Cornell Medical College in Qatar
 City University College
 German University Qatar
 University College London Qatar (UCL Qatar) [2010-2020]
 MIE-SPPU Institute of Higher Education (Savitribai Phule Pune University's Qatar Campus)

References

External links 
 Universities in Doha, Qatar

Universities
Qatar
Qatar